William Henry Chandler may refer to:

 William Henry Chandler (politician) (1815–1888)
 William Henry Chandler (chemist) (1841–1906)
 William Henry Chandler (painter) (1854–1928)
 William Henry Chandler (botanist) (1878–1970)

See also
William Chandler (disambiguation)